The Yagalingu were an indigenous Australian people of the state of Queensland.
Their language may have been a dialect of Bidjara.

Country
The northern reaches lay around Laglan, while to the west they ran to the Great Dividing Range. Their eastern and southern limits were at the Drummond Range.

Social organization
The following clan groups are known
 Wakelbara (eel (wakel) clan, near Laglan
 Kokleburra
 Owanburra/Kowanburra/Auanbura) (upper Belyando River).

Alternative names
 Wakelbara Kokleburra Owanburra Kowanburra Auanbura''

Notes

Citations

Sources

Aboriginal peoples of Queensland